The Justice and Truth Alliance (originally in ; or D.A. for short, meaning "yes" in Romanian) was a political alliance comprising two political parties in Romania, namely the centre-right liberal National Liberal Party (PNL) and the initially left-wing Democratic Party (PD), which later switched to center-right ideology.

Although the National Union PSD+PUR had won the largest number of seats in the Parliament, the Justice and Truth Alliance formed the government from 2004 to 2007 in a coalition with the Democratic Alliance of Hungarians in Romania (UDMR/RMDSZ) and the Conservative Party (PUR), which had changed sides after DA's candidate won the presidential elections.

Background 

The alliance had its origins in a collaboration between the two parties which began in early 2002 at the initiative of the PNL's former president, Valeriu Stoica. The creation of the alliance was formally approved on 29 September 2003 by the executives of both parties, after months of negotiations between the parties. It was established as a vehicle for of coordinating opposition efforts against the ruling Social Democratic Party (PSD). Its name was chosen in reference to the PSD's alleged corruption - as PNL president Theodor Stolojan put it, "we want the alliance to set us free from corruption and lies."

On 25 October 2004, the Justice and Truth alliance endorsed its co-chairman Călin Popescu-Tăriceanu (at that time also the leader of the PNL) as its leader in the 2004 Romanian general election. According to Popescu-Tăriceanu, the alliance's political priorities were:

 Stimulating investments and private initiative;
 Creating of new jobs and increasing net incomes to alleviate poverty;
 Delivering a "responsible social policy" in the field of education, healthcare, pensions, and social assistance;
 Fighting corruption;
 Establishing a non-political judiciary.

In the 2004 presidential election and the simultaneous legislative election, held on 28 November, the DA polled better than expected in both races. It came within a few percentage points behind the PSD, eliminating the previous government's majority as a result. A new post-electoral alliance was formed between the Justice and Truth (DA), the Democratic Alliance of Hungarians in Romania (UDMR/RMDSZ), and the Conservative Party (PC), forming thus a simple majority (accounting for 54.5% of the seats) which then had the legitimacy to appoint ministers in a new grand coalition government. The protocols of the alliance between DA and UDMR were signed on 20 December 2004 while those between DA and PUR were signed on 23 December 2004.

DA's presidential candidate, Traian Băsescu, won the presidential election and was subsequently the 4th President of Romania. DA, alongside the Democratic Alliance of Hungarians in Romania (UDMR/RMDSZ) and the Humanist Party of Romania (which subsequently became the Conservative Party) both quit the ruling coalition 3 December 2006, consequently leaving the two remaining parties (i.e. PD and PNL) without a simple majority in the Parliament.

During early April 2007, Popescu-Tăriceanu dismissed the Democratic Party (PD) ministers from the government and formed a minority cabinet along with the Democratic Alliance of Hungarians in Romania (UDMR/RMDSZ), thereby marking the end of the alliance.

Electoral history

Legislative elections

Notes:

1 Justice and Truth Alliance members: PNL (28 senators and 64 deputies) and PD (21 senators and 48 deputies).

Presidential elections

Notable members 
 Theodor Stolojan (PNL)
 Călin Popescu-Tăriceanu (PNL)
 Traian Băsescu (PD)
 Emil Boc (PD)

References

External links
Official website

Liberal parties in Romania
Defunct political party alliances in Romania
National Liberal Party (Romania)